Baldev Raj Chopra (22 April 1914 – 5 November 2008) was a famous Indian director and producer of Bollywood industry and television series . Best known for directing Hindi films like Naya Daur (1957), Sadhna (1958), Kanoon (1961), Gumrah (1963), Humraaz (1967), Insaf Ka Tarazu (1980), Nikaah (1982), Awam (1987), and the producer of TV series, Mahabharat in 1988. He was awarded Dadasaheb Phalke Award, India's highest award in cinema, for the year 1998, and Padma Bhushan, India's third highest civilian award, in 2001. 

His younger brother Yash Chopra, son Ravi Chopra and nephews Aditya Chopra and Karan Johar are also directors in the Bollywood industry. His nephew Uday Chopra is an actor and producer.

Biography
Chopra was born on 22 April 1914 in Rahon, Shaheed Bhagat Singh Nagar district (formerly Nawanshahr district) to Vilayati Raj Chopra, an employee of the PWD. He later shifted to Lahore. He was the second of several siblings; his youngest brother was filmmaker Yash Chopra.

Chopra received an M.A. in English literature from University of the Punjab in Lahore. He started his career in 1944 as a film journalist with Cine Herald, a film-monthly published in Lahore, he later took over the magazine and ran it until 1947. In the same year, he launched a film with a story by I. S. Johar, Chandni Chowk. Naeem Hashmi was hero of this movie and Erika Rukhshi was the heroine. Just as the production of film was to start, riots broke out in Lahore and he and his family had to flee from the city. After the partition of India into India and Pakistan in 1947, he moved to Delhi. He later moved to Mumbai, where his first production, Karwat, began in 1948, though it turned out to be a flop. His first film as a director, Afsana, was released in 1951 and featured Ashok Kumar in a double role – the film was a hit and established his name in Bollywood. Chopra made Chandni Chowk, with Meena Kumari as a lead, in 1954. In 1955, Chopra formed his own production house, B.R Films. His first movie for this production house was Ek Hi Raasta which was highly successful. He followed it up with Naya Daur (1957) starring Dilip Kumar and Vyjayantimala Bali, the film became a golden jubilee hit. His subsequent releases like Kanoon, Gumrah, Humraaz were major hits in the sixties. In 1963, he was a member of the jury at the 13th Berlin International Film Festival. His second film with actor Dilip Kumar was Dastaan which became a flop in 1972.

He directed successful film across genres after 1972, with films like suspense thriller Dhund, drama Karma (1977), comedy film Pati Patni Aur Woh, crime film in Insaf Ka Tarazu, Muslim social in Nikaah and the political thriller Awam.

He was the producer for the films Dhool Ka Phool, Waqt, Aadmi Aur Insaan and Ittefaq directed by his younger brother Yash Chopra, and he also produced The Burning Train, Aaj Ki Awaaz, Mazdoor, Baghban, Baabul, Bhoothnath which were directed by Ravi Chopra.

Chopra forayed into television with Mahabharat, whose become the most successful TV serials with 92% viewers record in Indian television history, where Nitish Bharadwaj played the role of Krishna and Mukesh khanna portrayed the role of Bhism pitamah and this was co-directed by him with his son. He also produced TV Series on Bahadur Shah Zafar, Kanoon (1993), Aap Beeti , Vishnu Puran (2000) and Maa Shakti. He produced films like Baghbhan, Babul and Bhootnath, after 2000.

He died in Mumbai at the age of 94 on 5 November 2008, survived by his son, Ravi Chopra, and two daughters Shashi and Bina.

Awards

Civilian awards
 Padma Bhushan: 2001
National Film Awards
 1960: Certificate of Merit for Best Feature Film in Hindi – Kanoon
 1961: President's silver medal for Best Feature Film in Hindi – Dharmputra (Producer)
 1998: Dadasaheb Phalke Award
Filmfare Awards
 1962: Filmfare Award for Best Director: Kanoon
 2003: Filmfare Lifetime Achievement Award

Filmography

References

External links

 
 B R Chopra's unforgettable movies Rediff.com

1914 births
2008 deaths
20th-century Indian film directors
20th-century Indian screenwriters
21st-century Indian dramatists and playwrights
21st-century Indian male writers
Dadasaheb Phalke Award recipients
Film directors from Mumbai
Film directors from Punjab, India
Film producers from Mumbai
Film producers from Punjab, India
Filmfare Awards winners
Filmfare Lifetime Achievement Award winners
Hindi film producers
Hindi screenwriters
Hindi-language film directors
Indian male screenwriters
People from Shaheed Bhagat Singh Nagar district
Punjabi people
Recipients of the Padma Bhushan in arts
Screenwriters from Mumbai
Screenwriters from Punjab, India
University of the Punjab alumni
20th-century Indian male writers